René Osvaldo Alinco Bustos (born 2 June 1958) is a Chilean politician and former worker.

External links
 
 BCN Profile

1958 births
Living people
21st-century Chilean politicians
Chilean people of Mapuche descent
Communist Party of Chile politicians
Party for Democracy (Chile) politicians
Radical Social Democratic Party of Chile politicians
People from Aysén Region